Borup Fiord is located on Ellesmere Island, Qikiqtaaluk Region, Nunavut Canada. The mouth of the fiord opens into Greely Fiord. To the west is Oobloyah Bay and to the north is the Neil Peninsula and the Neil Icecap. The eastern arm, known as Esayoo Bay leads to Borup Fiord Pass. Detailed studies of the Borup Fiord area between Oobloyah Bay and Esayoo Bay have been done in summer 1988 by geographers from Heidelberg University.

See also
List of fjords in Canada

References

Ellesmere Island
Fjords of Qikiqtaaluk Region